The men's synchronized 3 metre springboard diving competition at the 2015 European Games in Baku took place on 20 June at the Baku Aquatics Centre.

Results
The final was held at 19:00.

References

Women's 3 metre synchronized springboard